Elcocks Brook (formally Elcock's Brook) is a hamlet in Feckenham parish, southwest of the town of Redditch, in Worcestershire, England.

Politics
Elcock's Brook is part of the Astwood Bank and Feckenham ward on the Redditch Borough Council. It is represented by the two Conservative Party Councillors Brandon Clayton and Michael Chalk.

It is part of the UK Parliament constituency of Redditch, which is represented by Rachel Maclean of the Conservative Party.

Surrounding settlements
Elcock's Brook is to the west of the small village of Callow Hill. It lies northeast of Cruise Hill and northwest of Ham Green and Feckenham. It is southwest of Bentley and southeast of the Redditch district of Webheath.

Amenities
The Brook Inn is off Sillins Lane on Ham Green Lane in Elcock's Brook.

Elcock's Brook and surrounding villages such a Callow Hill, Cruise Hill, Ham Green and Feckenham are extremely rural.

See also

References 

Hamlets in Worcestershire